Association Sportive de l'Armée Nationale Mauritanienne known as AS Armée Nationale is a Mauritanean football club based in Tidjikja the capital of the Tagant Region. The club plays in the Mauritanean Premier League.

Stadium
Currently the team plays at the 10,000 capacity Stade Olympique (Nouakchott).

References

External links
Team profile - maurifoot.net
Team profile - soccerway.com

Football clubs in Mauritania
Association football clubs established in 1960
1960 establishments in Africa
Military association football clubs